The president of the Senate of Thailand was the presiding officer of the upper chamber of the National Assembly of Thailand.

List of presidents of the Senate

Sources
Various editions of The Europa World Year Book

References

Senate, President
Thailand, Senate
Presidents of the Senate of Thailand